Sanahanbi Devi is representative for India in the sport of Kabaddi. She was a member of the team that won a gold medal in the 2010 Asian games in Guangzhou.

References

Living people
Indian kabaddi players
Asian Games medalists in kabaddi
Kabaddi players at the 2010 Asian Games
Asian Games gold medalists for India
Medalists at the 2010 Asian Games
Year of birth missing (living people)
Place of birth missing (living people)